Antje Traue (born 18 January 1981) is a German actress. She appeared in her first English-language role for the film Pandorum. Internationally, she is best known for her portrayal of the villain Faora in the 2013 Superman movie Man of Steel, and as Agnes Nielsen in the German Netflix series Dark.

Early and personal life
Traue was born in Mittweida, Saxony, in the former German Democratic Republic (East Germany). Her mother was a dancer and musician. Traue was raised speaking Russian. She speaks German and English fluently. She trained as an artistic gymnast from age six to her teens in an elite training unit. Her stage career began when she portrayed Jeanne d'Arc in a school play. At sixteen, she won the lead role in the International Munich Art Lab's first ever "Hip Hopera" (the musical "West End Opera").

Traue was previously in a relationship with actor Ben Foster, moving to Los Angeles to live with him.

Career
Traue performed and toured with the production for four years, appearing on stages throughout Germany, Europe, and in New York City.

In 2008, Traue was chosen for the lead female role in the film Pandorum, a science fiction/thriller film directed by Christian Alvart, written by Travis Milloy, and starring Dennis Quaid and Ben Foster.

In 2013, Traue played villain Faora in the Superman film Man of Steel, to positive reviews.
In preparation for the role of Faora, Traue underwent an intense four-month training and dieting program.

In 2014, Traue portrayed Bony Lizzie in the Universal Pictures action-fantasy film Seventh Son. She received critical acclaim in Germany for portraying the fictional character of Giselle Neumayer in the 2016 ARD-produced TV movie , and nominations as best actress in German TV productions for 2016 both for her female lead roles in the TV mini series Weinberg and Berlin 1. She has since been cast in several German and international movies and TV productions in lead roles or recurrent supporting roles, including the 2017 movie Bye Bye Germany alongside actor Moritz Bleibtreu directed by Sam Garbarski, and the 2017 Amazon series pilot episode Oasis. Traue's further acting appearances in 2017 and 2018 include the German Netflix series production Dark (as Agnes Nielsen), and German movies Das Ende der Wahrheit, Spielmacher and Ballon. In 2019, Traue headlined the cast in the German ZDFneo TV miniseries Dead End. 

Traue is set to reprise her role as Faora in The Flash, which will be released in 2023.

Filmography

Film

Television

References

External links
 
 Antje Traue at Spielkind talent agency
 

1981 births
Living people
21st-century German actresses
German film actresses
German television actresses
People from Mittweida
20th-century German actresses
Actors from Saxony